Majella Cullinane, born in Limerick, Ireland is an author based in New Zealand.

Background 
Born and raised in Ireland, Cullinane became a New Zealand resident in 2008. She has a MLitt. in Creative Writing from the University of St Andrews, Scotland, and completed a PhD in Creative Practice at the Centre for Irish and Scottish Studies at the University of Otago. She currently lives in Port Chalmers, New Zealand.

Cullinane draws inspiration for her work from myths and history, with her poems exploring nature and dreams, real and imagined people. Her collection Guarding the Flame takes its title from the myth surrounding Saint Bridgid’s flame in Kildare.

Works 
 Guarding the Flame (Salmon Poetry, 2011), collection of poetry
 The Life of De'Ath (Steele Roberts Aotearoa, 2018), novel
 Whisper of a Crow's Wing (Salmon Poetry and Otago University Press, 2018)

Awards 
Her first novel,The Life of De'Ath, was shortlisted for the 2016 Dundee International Book Prize. and longlisted for the 2019 Ockham New Zealand Book Awards.

In 2014 she was awarded the Robert Burns Fellowship, a literary residency at the University of Otago in Dunedin, New Zealand.

Cullinane has also received a Seán Dunne Young Writers' Awards for Poetry, an Irish Arts Council Award and the Hennessy XO/Irish Times Literary Award for Emerging Poetry.

References

Further reading 
Excerpts from Guarding the Flame

Living people
New Zealand women poets
New Zealand women novelists
Irish women novelists
Irish women poets
Writers from Limerick (city)
People from Port Chalmers
University of Otago alumni
Alumni of the University of St Andrews
Irish emigrants to New Zealand
Year of birth missing (living people)